Nemir is both a given name and a surname. It may refer to:

Edgar Nemir (1919–1969), American sport wrestler
Nemir Kirdar, Iraqi businessman
Nemir Matos-Cintrón (born 1949), Puerto Rican writer and poet

See also
Nemir (film), 1982 Croatian film